Echinolittorina granosa is a species of sea snail, a marine gastropod mollusk in the family Littorinidae, the winkles or periwinkles.

Description

Distribution
This species occurs in the Atlantic Ocean off Gabon.

References

 Reid D.G. (1989) The comparative morphology, phylogeny and evolution of the gastropod family Littorinidae. Philosophical Transactions of the Royal Society B 324: 1–110.

Endemic fauna of Gabon
Littorinidae
Gastropods described in 1845